Yaroslavl (Tunoshna) International Airport (Tunoshna - also Tunoshnoye, or Tunoschna)  is an airport in Yaroslavl Oblast, Russia, located 18 km southeast of Yaroslavl. It is served by medium-sized airliners. The airport is situated next to the Volga River.

History
During the Cold War Tunoshna was a key interceptor aircraft base.  It was home to 415 IAP (415th Interceptor Aviation Regiment).  The base initially operated the Sukhoi Su-9 (Fishpot) in the 1960s.  The regiment replaced it in 1979 with the MiG-23P (Flogger-G).  This aircraft served at Tunoshna during the 1980s and 1990s.  The 415 IAP was decommissioned in 1992 and the MiG-23s were sent to Rzhev.

Terminals 
The passenger terminal (with an area of 1000 m2) is designed to handle 180 domestic or 100 international passengers per hour. The cargo terminal (with an area of 833 m2) is designed to handle up to 150 tonnes of cargo per day. The airport complex entered service in 2002 and was reconstructed in 2013.

Airlines and destinations 

The list of regular services changes frequently. According to the airport's website as of February 2020 the following flights are scheduled:

Accidents and incidents 
On 6 September 1994, the MiG-23UB crashed into terrain due to loss of control.

On 7 September 2011, the 2011 Lokomotiv Yaroslavl plane crash occurred, killing nearly the entire Lokomotiv Yaroslavl Kontinental Hockey League professional ice hockey team. A Yak-Service Yak-42, carrying the team to a game in Minsk, Belarus crashed on take-off from Tunoshna, killing 44 of the 45 occupants. The cause was determined to be pilot error, when one of the two pilots incorrectly applied braking during takeoff, attributed to a lack of training in the aircraft.

References

External links

Soviet Air Force bases
Soviet Air Defence Force bases
Russian Air Force bases
Airports built in the Soviet Union
Airports in Yaroslavl Oblast